The list of medieval bridges in France comprises all bridges built between 500 and 1500 AD in what is today France, that is including regions which were not part of the country in the Middle Ages, such as Burgundy, Alsace, Lorraine and Savoie. Along with those Roman bridges which remained in service throughout the period, there are in total over 700 structures known.

See also 
List of Roman bridges
List of medieval stone bridges in Germany

References

Sources 
Marjorie Nice Boyer: Medieval French Bridges. A History, Cambridge: Massachusetts, The Mediaeval Academy of America 1976, pp. 171–195

Medieval bridges in France
Medieval Bridges

Medieval